Mulukhiyah, also known as  molokhia, molohiya, or ewedu, is a dish made from the leaves of Corchorus olitorius, commonly known in English as denje'c'jute, nalta jute, tossa jute, jute mallow or Jew's Mallow. It is used as a vegetable and is mainly eaten in the Levant (Syria, Lebanon, Palestine, and Jordan), Egypt, Cyprus, Libya, and Tunisia. In some countries it is called “Saluyot” in the Philippines. Mulukhiyah is rather bitter, and when boiled, the resulting liquid is a thick, highly mucilaginous broth; it is often described as "slimy", rather like cooked okra. Mulukhiyah is generally eaten cooked, not raw, and it is either eaten chopped and sautéed in oil, garlic and cilantro like in Syria or turned into a kind of soup or stew like in Egypt, typically bearing the same name as the vegetable in the local language. Traditionally mulukhiyah is cooked with chicken or at least chicken stock for flavor and is served with white rice, accompanied with lemon or lime.

Origins and history 
While most scholars are of the opinion that mulukhiyah's origins lie in Ancient Egypt, there is evidence that India is the source of the related species Corchorus capsularis, which is also used for food as well as fiber. 

Mulukhiyah was a known dish in the Medieval Arab world. The recipe on how to prepare it is mentioned in the 14th century Arabic book Kanz al-Fawa'id fi Tanwi' al-Mawa'id. According to the Egyptian historian al-Maqrizi (d. 1442), mulukhiyah was the favorite dish of caliph Muawiyah ibn Abi Sufyan the founder of the Umayyad Caliphate. Furthermore, on the 7th of Muharram in the year 395 AH (1005 AD) the Fatimid ruler of Egypt al-Hakim bi Amr Allah issued a decree which prohibited his subjects from eating the mulukhiyah, which was thought to be an aphrodisiac. However, his successor caliph al-Zahir permitted the eating of mulukhiya again. The Druze, who hold Al-Hakim in high regard and give him quasi-divine authority, continue to respect the ban, and do not eat Mulukhiyah of any kind to this day.

Culinary varieties

Arab World

Egyptian cuisine
As used in Egyptian cuisine,  is prepared by removing the central spine from the leaves, and then chopping the leaves finely with garlic and coriander. The dish generally includes some sort of meat; in Egypt this is usually chicken or rabbit, but lamb is preferred when available, particularly in Cairo. Cooks in Alexandria often opt to use shrimp in the soup, while Port Said is famous for using fish.

 was consumed in ancient Egyptian cuisine, where the name "" is thought to have originated.

Many Egyptians consider  to be the national dish of Egypt, along with ful medames and kushari.

The Egyptian style of preparing molokhiya is distinctive, and is particularly different from the Levantine variant. The molokhiya leaves are picked off the stem, with tall stemmed branches. They are then placed on a large sheet (cloth material) to be left to completely dry for later use.

After drying, the leaves are chopped fine, often with a mezzaluna. The leaves are then boiled in broth; if meat or seafood is being used, it is added at this point, and may be bone-in or boneless. Coriander and garlic are fried separately in ghee or oil to make the "ta'leyya" (literally "a frying" or "fried thing"), and then added to the soup at the end while the ta'leyya is still sizzling.

The soup is served on white rice or with a side of Egyptian flatbread (ʿeish baladi). The dish is often accompanied with an assortment of pickled vegetables, known as  mekhallel or torshi in Egypt. Tomato sauce, vinegar, and other condiments may also be present.

Levantine cuisine

The standard molokhia dish in the Levant is prepared by cooking a meat of some sort in a separate pot by boiling. Later garlic is cooked to a simmer, then water and chicken stock cubes are added to form a broth. After boiling, the cooked chicken or meat with the broth coriander and molokhia leaves are added and further cooked another 15 minutes. It is served with white rice and fresh lemon. Also, in northern Lebanon, a dish called mloukhiye b zeit is made using fresh leaves and shoots of the Nalta jute plant, cooked in olive oil, onions, garlic, tomatoes and chilli peppers; it is a popular summer side dish, especially in Miniyeh-Danniyeh and Akkar districts.

Bedouins have an old tradition of cooking a different version of the dish. A whole chicken is cut open, the intestines removed, and the innards stuffed with herbs, spices and raw rice then sewn shut with thick thread. The chicken is then boiled to create the broth for the molokhia soup which, after preparation, is served as five separate components:  The molokhia soup, Arabic flat bread, the chicken (stuffed with flavored rice), additional plain rice, and a small bowl with a mixture of lemon juice and sliced chilli. The soup is mixed with rice and lemon juice according to taste, while the chicken is eaten on a separate plate.

Tunisian and Libyan cuisine
In Tunisia and Libya , the dish is generally prepared quite differently from the Egyptian method. The leaves, already separated from the stems, are dried then ground to produce a very fine powder and stored in jars or other tightly closed containers. Cooking, mulukhya, or mloukhiya, takes 5 to 7 hours to prepare, which is often done to halfway in the evening and completed in the morning. This method identifies the dish as being of Jewish origin, as it is left to cook throughout the Jewish Sabbath on which active cooking is prohibited. The powder is prepared with olive oil and some sometimes tomato paste into a sauce, not soup, and big chunks of chuck beef are often added halfway through cooking. The dark green sauce simmers on low heat and is left to thicken to the consistency of tomato sauce. The sauce is served in small deep plates with a piece of beef and eaten with preferably white hearty traditional bread. In certain regions where beef is not common, lamb is used but cooks for a much shorter time ,.

Kenyan cuisine
In Kenya, the dish is known as murere (Luhya), murenda, apoth (Luo), and several other native language names. It is a very popular vegetable dish among communities in the Western region (Vihiga, Kakamega, Busia, Trans Nzoia and Bungoma Counties) and in Nyanza region (Kisumu, Siaya, Homa Bay, Kisii, Migori and Nyamira Counties). Both regions are in the area around Lake Victoria. The jute leaves are separated from the stems, washed, and then boiled in lightly salted water with ligadi (a raw form of soda (bicarbonate of soda), or munyu (traditional plant-based salt). The leaves are boiled with other leafy vegetables such as likuvi (Vigna unguiculata (cowpea) leaves) or mito (Chipilín) to reduce their sliminess and help soften the other vegetable leaves. In some cases, after boiling for about thirty minutes, the vegetables are stewed with tomatoes and onions in oil. (There are several general ways to prepare the mutere and more ways in which it is served). Spices such as curry, pepper, masala, or coriander are optional. Mutere is served with ugali (a staple stuff, cooked cereal meal) and can be accompanied with meat or chicken.

West African cuisines
The leaf is a common food in many tropical West African countries.  It is believed that the "drip tips" on the leaves serve to shed excess water from the leaf from the heavy rains in the tropics. Called minnou(wi) or crin-crin sauce in Benin, and similarly kren-kre in Sierra Leone, it is eaten in a palm oil sauce served with rice or cassava fufu (a traditional food made from cassava), or else is steamed and mixed into rice just before eating a non-palm oil sauce. Among the Yorubas in south-west Nigeria, it is called ewedu and served with cooked yam flour (amala). In Liberia it is called palaver sauce, and is served with rice or fufu. In The Gambia it is referred to as kereng-kereng and is typically used to make supakanja (a dish mostly served on Saturdays and made with okra, red palm oil, fish and meat).

In Ghana, it is known as Ademe ewe or Ayoyo leaves and used to make accompanying soups for Banku (a corn cassavas dough dish) or cooked rice).

Cypriot cuisine
In Cyprus the dish is known as molohiya. It is popular among the Greek Cypriots and Turkish Cypriots. The jute leaves are cultivated and grown in the spring, whereupon they are harvested and the leaves are separated from the stem and dried whole. They are cooked in a tomato-based broth with onions and garlic. Lamb on the bone or chicken with bone may also be added. For optimal results, lemon and potato are also used to help keep the consistency from becoming too mucilaginous or slimy. It is served with a broth consistency with sourdough bread.

Haitian cuisine 

In Haiti, the leafy green dish is commonly known as Lalo and is traditionally cooked with or without meat. When considering meat, Haitians utilize beef or pork shoulder. Seafood such as blue crabs, shrimp or snow crab legs are also options. It is traditionally served with white rice.

Nutrition 

The leaves are rich in folate, beta-carotene, iron, calcium, vitamin C and more than 32 vitamins, minerals and trace elements. The plant has a potent antioxidant activity with a significant α-tocopherol equivalent vitamin E.

Ancient references
The word for the plant is found in ancient Mediterranean languages such as Arabic and Greek. Cognates of the word include Ancient Greek μαλάχη (malákhē) or μολόχη (molókhē), Modern Greek μολόχα (molókha), modern  (mulukhiyah) and modern  (malukhia).

See also
 List of Middle Eastern dishes
 List of African dishes

Notes

External links 

 Mulukhiyya recipe

Ancient dishes
Egyptian cuisine
Algerian cuisine
Arab cuisine
Cypriot cuisine
Fiber plants
Grewioideae
Jute
Leaf vegetables
Lebanese cuisine
Jordanian cuisine
Levantine cuisine
Mediterranean cuisine
National dishes
Palestinian cuisine
Syrian cuisine
Turkish Cypriot cuisine